John Charles Anderson (November 23, 1929 – December 20, 1998) was an American professional baseball player and right-handed pitcher who appeared in 24 games during parts of three seasons in Major League Baseball between 1958 and 1962 for the Philadelphia Phillies, Baltimore Orioles, St. Louis Cardinals and Houston Colt .45s. His professional career spanned 472 games and 16 seasons, from 1952 to 1967, most of which were spent in the minor leagues.

Born in Saint Paul, Anderson attended the University of Minnesota. But he wasn't called up to Philadelphia until he was 28 and a seven-year minor-league veteran. In his MLB debut, he threw a scoreless inning of relief on August 17, 1958, on the road against the Milwaukee Braves. Then, seven days later, he made his only big-league start at Wrigley Field against the Chicago Cubs. Anderson went six innings and allowed seven hits but only two runs when Jim Marshall homered with a man aboard in the third frame. He left the contest for a pinch hitter in the seventh inning trailing 2–1, and when the Phils rallied for four runs in the eighth to win the rain-shortened contest, 5–3, they took Anderson off the hook for the potential defeat. Anderson appeared three more times for the 1958 Phillies, but was treated roughly, his earned run average spiking from 2.57 to 7.88.

He then spent 1959 back in the minors before getting his second big-league audition with the 1960 Orioles during the season's early weeks. He pitched in four contests in relief for Baltimore and was effective in his first two appearances before two terrible outings against the New York Yankees inflated his ERA from 0.00 to 13.50. The remainder of 1960 and all of 1961 was spent in the Triple-A International League before the Cardinals acquired him in the 1961 Rule 5 draft. He made the Redbirds' 1962 early-season roster and turned in a solid overall performance, registering his lone MLB save and allowing only one run in five relief appearances over 6 innings pitched through May 5. Two days later, the Cardinals included him in a trade to the Colt .45s, a brand-new expansion team, in which St. Louis obtained veteran left-hander Bobby Shantz from Houston for Anderson and outfielder Carl Warwick. The Colt .45s used Anderson in ten games out of their bullpen through June 23, but he failed to repeat his earlier success as a Cardinal, posting a 5.09 ERA in 17 innings.  He returned to the minors for the rest of his career.

All told, he was credited with one save but no decisions during his 24-game big-league tenure. In 44 total innings pitched, he permitted 32 earned runs, 64 hits and 14 bases on balls, striking out 19.

John Anderson died in Houston at age 69 on December 20, 1998.

References

External links

John Anderson at SABR (Baseball BioProject)
John Anderson at Baseball Almanac

1929 births
1998 deaths
Amarillo Sonics players
Baltimore Orioles players
Baseball players from Saint Paul, Minnesota
Hawaii Islanders players
Houston Colt .45s players
Major League Baseball pitchers
Miami Marlins (IL) players
Oklahoma City 89ers players
Philadelphia Phillies players
Reidsville Phillies players
Rochester Red Wings players
St. Louis Cardinals players
Salt Lake City Bees players
Schenectady Blue Jays players
Spokane Indians players
Syracuse Chiefs players
Terre Haute Phillies players
Toronto Maple Leafs (International League) players
Tulsa Oilers (baseball) players